Gnato (also spelled Gnanto) is a village in the south-western corner of Ivory Coast. It is in the sub-prefecture of Djamandioké, Tabou Department, San-Pédro Region, Bas-Sassandra District. The village sits on the east bank of the Cavalla River, which forms the border between Ivory Coast and Liberia.

Gnato was a commune until March 2012, when it became one of 1126 communes nationwide that were abolished.

Notes

Former communes of Ivory Coast
Populated places in Bas-Sassandra District
Populated places in San-Pédro Region